Florenc is a Prague Metro station providing the interchange between Lines B and C, situated in Karlín, Prague 8. It serves Florenc Central Bus Station.

The station was formerly known as Sokolovská. The Line C station was opened on 5 September 1974 as the southern terminus of the inaugural section of Prague Metro, between Sokolovská and Kačerov. On 3 November 1984, the line was extended to Fučíkova (later renamed Nádraží Holešovice). On 2 November 1985, the inaugural section of Line B was opened, from Sokolovská to Smíchovské nádraží. On 22 November 1990, Line B was extended to Českomoravská.

Since June 2022, the station's vestibule has been under long term renovation.

References

Prague Metro stations
Railway stations opened in 1974
1974 establishments in Czechoslovakia
Railway stations in the Czech Republic opened in the 20th century